German submarine U-320 was a Type VIIC/41 U-boat of Nazi Germany's Kriegsmarine during World War II.

She carried out just two patrols, but did not sink any ships.

The boat was badly damaged on 8 May 1945 by a British aircraft and consequently scuttled by the crew in the North Sea; the last to be sunk by direct action.

Design
German Type VIIC/41 submarines were preceded by the heavier Type VIIC submarines. U-320 had a displacement of  when at the surface and  while submerged. She had two shafts and two  propellers.

U-320 was fitted with five  torpedo tubes (four fitted at the bow and one at the stern), fourteen torpedoes, one  SK C/35 naval gun, (220 rounds), one  Flak M42 and two  C/30 anti-aircraft guns. The boat had a complement of between forty-four and sixty.

Service history

The submarine was laid down on 1 December 1942 by the Flender Werke yard at Lübeck as yard number 320, launched on 6 November 1943 and commissioned on 30 December under the command of Oberleutnant zur See Siegfried Breinlinger.

She served with the 4th U-boat Flotilla for training, from 30 December 1943 to 1 April 1944 and the 5th flotilla for operations until her sinking on 8 May 1945.

First patrol
U-320 departed Kiel on 16 April 1945 and arrived in Horten Naval Base (south of Oslo), on the 21st.

Second patrol and loss
The boat left Horten on 27 April 1945. On 8 May she was badly damaged by depth charges dropped from a British Catalina of No. 210 Squadron RAF. The battered submarine managed to surface off the Norwegian coast, where she was scuttled.

See also
 Battle of the Atlantic (1939-1945)
 Actions of 7–8 May 1945

Notes

Citations

Bibliography

External links

German Type VIIC/41 submarines
U-boats commissioned in 1943
1943 ships
World War II submarines of Germany
Ships built in Lübeck
Maritime incidents in May 1945